Dudi Sela was the defending champion but lost in the first round to Hugo Grenier.

Andreas Seppi won the title after defeating Márton Fucsovics 5–7, 6–4, 6–3 in the final.

Seeds

Draw

Finals

Top half

Bottom half

References
Main Draw
Qualifying Draw

Canberra Challenger - Singles